Lacoma may refer to:

 Lacoma, West Virginia, a community in Wyoming County
 Lacoma (Madrid Metro), a public transport station in Fuencarral-El Pardo